Elmisaurus (meaning "foot sole lizard") is an extinct genus of caenagnathid dinosaur from the Late Cretaceous Nemegt Formation of Mongolia. It was a theropod belonging to the Oviraptorosauria.

Discovery
 
In 1970, a paleontological Polish-Mongolian expedition discovered two fragmentary specimens of a small theropod in the Ömnögovĭ province of Mongolia. The type species, Elmisaurus rarus, was named and described by Halszka Osmólska in 1981. The specific name means "rare" in Latin. The holotype, ZPAL MgD-I/172, consists of a left metatarsus fused with the tarsalia. There are two paratypes: ZPAL MgD-I/98, consisting of a right hand and foot, and ZPAL MgD-I/20, the upper part of the left metatarsus of a larger individual.

In a 2001 study conducted by Bruce Rothschild and other paleontologists, 23 foot bones referred to Elmisaurus were examined for signs of stress fracture, but none were found.

A second species, E. elegans, was named in 1989 by Philip J. Currie. This represented a North American form originally described as a species of Ornithomimus by William Arthur Parks in 1933, based on specimen ROM 781, a foot. Currie also referred the material of the American form Caenagnathus sternbergi, based on a jaw fragment, to Elmisaurus elegans. Due to their poor preservation and geographical distance from the type species, the classification of the American forms has been contentious. In 1997, Hans-Dieter Sues stated that this supposed second species of Elmisaurus should be referred to Chirostenotes, as C. elegans, though this position was not accepted by Currie. Other researchers, including Teresa Maryańska, Halszka Osmólska, and their colleagues, followed Sues in reassigning E. elegans to Chirostenotes.  In 2020, Gregory Funston assigned the material to the new genus and species Citipes.

A 2021 article by Funston and colleagues suggested Nomingia is a synonym of Elmisaurus.

Classification
 
The cladogram below follows an analysis by Longrich et al. in 2013, which found Elmisaurus to be a Caenagnathid.

See also

 Timeline of oviraptorosaur research

References

Late Cretaceous dinosaurs of Asia
Nemegt fauna
Caenagnathids
Fossil taxa described in 1981
Taxa named by Halszka Osmólska